was a multi-use stadium in Tokyo, Japan. It was as the main venue for the 1930 Far Eastern Games. It was demolished to make room for Tokyo Olympic Stadium in 1956. The stadium held 65,000 spectators.

From 1945 till 1952, during the occupation of Japan the stadium was renamed Nile Kinnick Stadium by the Eighth Army in honor of the 1939 Heisman Trophy winner.

References

External links
 Stadium information

Defunct sports venues in Japan
Defunct football venues in Japan
Sports venues in Tokyo
Defunct athletics (track and field) venues